The Mad Scientist Hall of Fame: Muwahahahaha! is a semi-satirical non-fiction book by Daniel Wilson and Anna C. Long published in August 2008.

2008 non-fiction books